Iowa Township may refer to:

 List of Iowa townships

Iowa
 Iowa Township, Allamakee County, Iowa
 Iowa Township, Benton County, Iowa
 Iowa Township, Cedar County, Iowa
 Iowa Township, Crawford County, Iowa
 Iowa Township, Dubuque County, Iowa, in Dubuque County, Iowa
 Iowa Township, Iowa County, Iowa
 Iowa Township, Jackson County, Iowa
 Iowa Township, Marshall County, Iowa
 Iowa Township, Washington County, Iowa
 Iowa Township, Wright County, Iowa

Kansas
 Iowa Township, Doniphan County, Kansas
 Iowa Township, Sherman County, Kansas

Nebraska
 Iowa Township, Holt County, Nebraska

North Dakota
 Iowa Township, Benson County, North Dakota

South Dakota
 Iowa Township, Beadle County, South Dakota, in Beadle County, South Dakota
 Iowa Township, Douglas County, South Dakota, in Douglas County, South Dakota

Township name disambiguation pages